There are a number of cemeteries in Metro Manila, the Philippines. Among the biggest and oldest are those found in the district of Santa Cruz, namely the Manila North Cemetery, La Loma Cemetery and the Manila Chinese Cemetery. The Fort Bonifacio reservation in Taguig is home to the country's national cemetery called Libingan ng mga Bayani, as well as the Manila American Cemetery and The Heritage Park. There are also a number of crematoria and columbaria, particularly along Gregorio Araneta Avenue in the Santa Mesa Heights district of Quezon City.

Gallery

See also
 List of cemeteries in the Philippines

References

External links
 Cemeteries in Metro Manila @ Yellow-Pages.ph
 Our Heritage and the Departed: A Cemeteries Tour
 Cemeteries of Memories

 
Cemeteries